OSDI can mean:
 Operating Systems: Design and Implementation, a computer science book by Andrew S. Tanenbaum
 Operating Systems Design and Implementation, a computer science conference sponsored by USENIX
 The ICAO code for Damascus International Airport in Syria